Ailertchen (formerly Elbörtchen) is an Ortsgemeinde – a community belonging to a Verbandsgemeinde – in the Westerwaldkreis in Rhineland-Palatinate, Germany. Since 1972 it has belonged to what was then the newly founded Verbandsgemeinde of Westerburg, a kind of collective municipality.

Geography 
Ailertchen lies 6 km northwest of Westerburg on a broad plain. Within the community rises the river Elbbach, part of the river Lahn’s drainage basin. At the community's southern edge lies the Ailertchen airport.

History 
In 930, Ailertchen had its first documentary mention.

Politics 

The municipal council is made up of 13 council members, including the extraofficial mayor (Bürgermeister), who were elected in a majority vote in a municipal election on 13 June 2004.

Economy and infrastructure 

Running straight through the community is the Bundesstraße 255 leading from Montabaur to Herborn. The nearest Autobahn interchange is Montabaur on the A 3, roughly 23 km away. Another Autobahn interchange on the A 3 can be reached by Bundesstraße 54 running towards Limburg. This is roughly 28 km away. Bundesstraße 255 towards Herborn leads to the A 45. The nearest InterCityExpress stop is the railway station at Montabaur on the Cologne-Frankfurt high-speed rail line.

External links 
 Ailertchen in the collective municipality’s Web pages

References

Municipalities in Rhineland-Palatinate
Westerwaldkreis